Bloom is an extinct town in Otero County, Colorado, United States. The GNIS classifies it as a populated place.

A post office called Bloom was established in 1913, and remained in operation until 1938. The community was named after Frank G. Bloom, a cattleman.

See also

 List of ghost towns in Colorado

References

External links

Ghost towns in Colorado
Geography of Otero County, Colorado